This is a list of notable organizations for women in science and, more generally; science, technology, engineering, and math.

General STEM-oriented groups
Science, technology, engineering, and math

 American Association of University Women (AAUW)
 Association for Women in Science (AWIS)
 European Platform of Women Scientists
 Graduate Women in Science (GWIS; formerly known as Sigma Delta Epsilon)
 International Network of Women in Engineering and Sciences
 Organization for Women in Science for the Developing World
 Kovalevskaia Fund

Subject-specific groups

 Computing and Information Technology
Ada Initiative (closed 2015)
AnitaB.org
Association for Computing Machinery Committee on Women 
BCSWomen, a specialist group of the British Computer Society
Black Girls Code
BlogHer
Center for Women in Technology
Committee on Widening Participation in Computing Research (CRA-WP) 
DC Web Women
Girl Geek Dinners
Girls Who Code
LinuxChix
National Center for Women & Information Technology (NCWIT)
Systers
 Tech LadyMafia
Women in Technology International
WorldWIT (closed in 2007)
WOUGNET (Women of Uganda Network)

 Earth sciences
 Association for Women Geoscientists

Engineering
 Society of Women Engineers

Mathematics
 Association for Women in Mathematics

 Medical sciences
 American Association for Women Radiologists
 American Medical Women's Association
 Association of Women Surgeons
 Kappa Epsilon (founded 1921 to promote woman pharmacists)
 Medical Women's International Association (est. 1919) 
 National Association of Women Pharmacists

 Social sciences
 Society of Woman Geographers

 Sociology
 Sociologists for Women in Society

Location-specific organizations
 Africa
 Women'sNet (South African support for women activists using technology)
 WOUGNET (Women of Uganda Network)

 Asia & South Pacific 
WomensHub (Philippines support for women activists using technology)
North America
 American Association of University Women (AAUW; founded 1881)
 Association for Women in Science (AWIS)
 DC Web Women (Washington, D.C.)

 Regional or international
 Organization for Women in Science for the Developing World

See also
 List of prizes, medals, and awards for women in science
List of women's organizations

References

 
Science, Women in
Science-related lists